Yu Wenge (born 18 March 1966) is a Chinese former track and field athlete who specialised in the discus throw. He was a three-time Chinese champion and one-time Asian champion.

He gained selection for China at the 1992 Summer Olympics as a result and finished 17th in the qualifying round. He performed better at the following 1992 IAAF World Cup held in Havana, taking the bronze medal with a throw of  behind Anthony Washington and Roberto Moya.

After a low period, he had a late career resurgence at the age of 31 in 1997. In his final global appearance he ranked 15th in qualifying at the 1997 World Championships in Athletics.

International competitions

National titles
Chinese Athletics Championships
Discus throw: 1991, 1992, 1997
Chinese National Games
Discus throw: 1997

References

External links

Living people
1966 births
Chinese male discus throwers
Olympic athletes of China
Athletes (track and field) at the 1992 Summer Olympics
World Athletics Championships athletes for China
20th-century Chinese people